Menghai County (Tai Lu: ᨾᩮᩨ᩠ᨦᩁᩣ᩠ᨿ Meng Haai ) is a county under the jurisdiction of Xishuangbanna Dai Autonomous Prefecture, in the far south of Yunnan, China, bordering Burma's Shan State to the southwest. Meng is as variation of  Mueang.

Ethnic groups
In and around Menghai County, ethnic Hani subgroups include:
Jiuwei (Dai exonym: Buli ; large population): villages include Nanzhong  of Mengjing , Longnapa  of Damenglong , and Baiya  Menggun , Menghai County.
Jizuo (small population): villages include Mengbozhai  of Menghan 
Muda (also locally known as the Nanlin )

Administrative divisions
Menghai County has 6 towns 2 townships and 3 ethnic townships.  
6 towns

2 townships
 Mengsong
 Mengwang
3 ethnic townships
 Gelanghe Hani
 Bulangshan Bulang
 Xiding Hani and Bulang

Transport
Nearest airport is Xishuangbanna Gasa
China National Highway 214 
Asian Highway Network AH3 (alternative route) with a border crossing into Myanmar at Daluo. The town on the Myanmar side of the border is Mong La where the road continues to Kengtung

Tea
Menghai is famous for its Bulang tea, a type of pu-erh grown in the Bulang Mountain area and its environs. Famous plantations include Laoman'e, Xinbanzhang and Laobanzhang.

Climate

References

Further reading
Jacobs, Andrew. EMBARGO: In once-booming tea region, a bitter reality. International Herald Tribune. (2009-01-09)

External links
 Menghai County Official Website

County-level divisions of Xishuangbanna Prefecture
China–Myanmar border crossings